The Japanese Cultural Center is a cultural center in Songshan District, Taipei, Taiwan about Japan, located at Japan–Taiwan Exchange Association building.

History
On 22 November 2017, a memorandum of understanding on cultural exchanges during the Taiwan-Japan economic and trade conference in Tokyo, Japan was signed. The cultural center was opened on 27 November 2017 in a ceremony attended by Japanese representative to Taiwan, Mikio Numata and head of Taiwan-Japan Relations Association, Chiou I-jen. In his opening remark, Chiou hoped that the center would continue promoting exchanges to boost the understanding of Taiwanese people on Japanese culture.

Exhibitions
The cultural center features a library with more than 20,000 Japanese culture and tourism-related books.

Activities
The cultural center is planning to hold a series of cultural exchange activities.

Transportation
The cultural center is accessible within walking distance northeast of Nanjing Fuxing Station of Taipei Metro.

See also
 Japan–Taiwan relations

References

2017 establishments in Taiwan
Cultural centers in Taipei
Japan–Taiwan relations